The Journal of Mathematics and the Arts is a quarterly peer-reviewed academic journal that deals with relationship between mathematics and the arts.

The journal was established in 2007 and is published by Taylor & Francis. The editor-in-chief is Mara Alagic (Wichita State University, Kansas).

References

External links 
 
 

Publications established in 2007
Mathematics journals
Arts journals
Multidisciplinary academic journals
Taylor & Francis academic journals
English-language journals
Quarterly journals
Mathematics and art